Laurent Spinosi (born in Marseille) is a retired French goalkeeper and current coach. He was formerly goalkeeping coach of Olympique de Marseille and Ivory Coast national team.

References 

1969 births
Living people
French footballers
Association football goalkeepers
French football managers
Olympique de Marseille players